Night and Day is an album by trumpeter Red Rodney with multi-instrumentalist Ira Sullivan which was recorded and released on the Muse label in 1981.

Reception

The AllMusic review by Scott Yanow stated "The Red Rodney-Ira Sullivan Quintet was one of the finest groups of the early 1980s. Rodney had an opportunity to play fresh material; Sullivan gained more exposure than he ever had in his career; and pianist Garry Dial was given high-profile and challenging writing assignments; bassist Barry Smith and drummer Steve Bagby completed the band in mid-1981".

Track listing
 "Night and Day" (Cole Porter) - 4:10
 "You Leave Me Breathless" (Friedrich Hollaender, Ralph Freed) – 6:30
 "Babies" (Jeff Meyer) – 6:06
 "Muck and Meyer" (Meyer) – 5:35
 "Frito Mistos" (Meyer) – 5:32
 "Dial-a-Brew" (Gary Dial) – 6:22

Personnel
Red Rodney – trumpet, flugelhorn
Ira Sullivan - soprano saxophone, alto saxophone, trumpet
Garry Dial – piano
Barry Smith – bass
Steve Bagby – drums

References

Muse Records albums
Red Rodney albums
Ira Sullivan albums
1981 albums
Albums produced by Bob Porter (record producer)